Saimum Series written by Abul Asad is a popular novel series of Bangladesh. Unlike other series of its kind, Saimum not only thrills its readers but also provides various informative and educative stuff. But above all, it stimulates into the mind of its reader the sense of morality and gradually makes them think to work for the betterment of humanity and peace. It also helps the readers to gain knowledge of History, geography and culture of many countries. Particularly the History of Islam, the geography of Muslim countries, the territories where they live in and their cultures. A reader can know about the present condition of Islam in the world. Abul Asad starts Saimum in 1976 with Operation Tel Aviv.

About Abul Asad (আবুল আসাদ)
The author of Saimum Series, Abul Asad, was born on 5 August 1942, at the village Narashinghpur in Rajshahi, Bangladesh. He started writing articles and stories since he was a student of Class 9. Gradually he became involved in journalism. He continued his studies with the activities of a journalist. He passed MS in economics. Now he is the editor of The Daily Sangram.
He is also a member of Bangla Shahitta Parishad. All the books of the Saimum Series are published from Bangla Shahitta Parishad. He wrote many other books as well, including Kalo Panchisher Age O Pore and Amra Sei Se Jati.

Plot of Saimum Series
Ahmad Musa is the protagonist of the series. The first book in the series briefly describes his past, where his family was killed, and he had to flee his own homeland Xinjiang to escape oppression. He is the most discussed person and the headache of the imperialistic power, the central gem of the Saimum, an organization working for oppressed people and against the imperialistic power.

Ahmad Musa tries his best to represent Islam through his character and actions. His strong sense of responsibility carries him around the world and makes him engage in various missions, adventures and rescue expeditions. Call of duty had him travel throughout the countries in most of the continents, including America and Europe.

Few of his noteworthy accomplishments are:
 Helping Palestine achieve its independence.
 Rescuing the Muslims in Córdoba, Suriname etc.
 Rescuing influential Muslims in the United States, Turkey, India and others.
 Unravelling the mystery behind the destruction of World Trade Center
 Fighting terrorist groups, for example Ku Klux Klan
 Destroying Zionist conspiracies in Palestine, USA, Turkey etc.

Published books of Saimum Series
Published books of Saimum Series are—
  (Operation Tel Aviv-1)
  (Operation Tel Aviv-2)

Saimum Series Unicode Project
A project name Saimum Series Unicode Project (সাইমুম সিরিজ ইউনিকোড প্রোজেক্ট) have launched to bring out Saimum Series in Unicode Bengali. Some volunteer are working in this project. The ultimate goal of this project is to spread Saimum Series all over the world specially to the Bengali people. Now almost all the books have been brought out in Unicode.

References

Further reading

External links
 Bangla Shahitta Parishad

Bangladeshi novels